Earlville Historic District is a national historic district located at Earlville in Chenango and Madison County, New York. The district contains 164 contributing buildings. It includes the commercial area at the center of the village and residential areas on the main thoroughfares and two side streets.  Most of the buildings in the district were built between 1880 and 1920.  Located within the district is the separately listed Earlville Opera House.

It was added to the National Register of Historic Places in 1982.

References

Historic districts on the National Register of Historic Places in New York (state)
Second Empire architecture in New York (state)
Italianate architecture in New York (state)
Historic districts in Madison County, New York
Historic districts in Chenango County, New York
National Register of Historic Places in Chenango County, New York
National Register of Historic Places in Madison County, New York